Balonmano Ciudad de Almería were a handball club based in Almería, Andalusia.

History 
Balonmano Ciudad de Almería was founded in 1991 and dissolved in 2009 due to the economic troubles.

Last Squad (2008–09)

Statistics 2008/09

Goals:
Alexandre Tioumentsev - 103 goals
Javier Bertos - 91 goals
Juan Antonio Vázquez - 90 goals
Catches:
Hector Marcos Tomás - 242 catches of 872 shots - 0.27 avg.
Ricardo Amérigo - 70 catches of 357 shots - 0.19 avg.

Stadium information
Name: - Mpal. Rafael Florido
City: - Almería
Capacity: - 2,000 people
Address: - Avda. de Mediterráneo, 228

External links 
BM Ciudad de Almería Official Website
 Documentacion para entrenadores de Balonmano
 Revista digital de la Liga Asobal

Spanish handball clubs
Sport in Almería
Defunct handball clubs
Handball clubs established in 1991
Handball clubs disestablished in 2009
1991 establishments in Spain
2009 disestablishments in Spain
Sports teams in Andalusia